The żaqq () is the most common form of Maltese bagpipes. The instrument was once associated with Maltese folk-festivals.

History

The use of the żaqq in daily life came to an end in the 1970s, the instrument having been perhaps replaced by the accordion earlier in the century. In 1977 the Galpin Society noted only nine remaining traditional pipers in Malta; the last of these, Toni "l-Hammarun" Cachia, died in 2004.<ref name="Society2001">. Last of the Maltese Bagpipers of Old'</ref> There are ongoing attempts to revive the instrument by various folk music ensembles such as Etnika.

Etymology and spelling

It is sometimes erroneously referred to as the zapp due to a spelling error in a 1939 English-language publication.  The Maltese word żaqq literally means "sack" or "belly" and derives from Arabic  ( "skin" [as a receptacle]).  is sometimes stated that żaqq derives from Italian  but this is not the case.

Further reading

Ruben Zahra. Iz-zaqq the Maltese bagpipe''. Mills College Theses, Mills College

References

Maltese musical instruments
Bagpipes